Kate Bernheimer is an American fairy-tale writer, scholar and editor.

Works 
Kate Bernheimer's first three novels, a trilogy based on Russian, German, and Yiddish fairy tales, "The Complete Tales of Lucy Gold" (2011), The Complete Tales of Merry Gold (2006), and "The Complete Tales of Ketzia Gold" (2001), were published by Fiction Collective 2. Amongst her other work, her short-story collection  Horse, Flower, Bird was published in Fall 2010 by Coffee House Press. She edited the World Fantasy Award winning collection of short stories, My Mother She Killed Me, My Father He Ate Me: Forty New Fairy Tales, which was published in Fall 2010 by Penguin Books. She is also the author of The Girl in the Castle Inside the Museum, chosen as a best picture book of the year by Publishers Weekly in 2008. Her most recent book for children is "The Lonely Book," illustrated by Chris Sheban and an Amazon.com "Best Books of the Month" selection for May 2012; it was published in April 2012 by Random House Children's Books.

Bernheimer is founder and editor of the journal Fairy Tale Review, as well as a number of fairy-tale anthologies, including Mirror, Mirror on the Wall (Doubleday, 2002) and Brothers and Beasts (Wayne State University Press, 2007).

Bernheimer is the co-curator and co-editor (with her brother, architect Andrew Bernheimer) of "Fairy Tale Architecture", published by Places Journal.

Bernheimer was also among a list of contributors to The &NOW Awards 2:  The Best Innovative Writing which released in spring of 2013.

She has a BA from Wesleyan University.

References

External links  
 UL Announces Writer-In-Residence Kate Bernheimer University of Louisiana (08/05/2009), Retrieved 23 August 2010
 in French: la petite fille qui vivait dans le château du musée

Year of birth missing (living people)
Living people
Wesleyan University alumni
Fairy tale scholars
American folklorists
Women folklorists
American women novelists
American women short story writers
American women children's writers
20th-century American novelists
21st-century American novelists
21st-century American short story writers
American children's writers
20th-century American women writers
21st-century American women writers